Oecanthus latipennis is a "common tree cricket" in the subfamily Oecanthinae ("tree crickets"). A common name for O. latipennis is broad-winged tree cricket.
It is found in North America.

References

Further reading
 
 Field Guide To Grasshoppers, Katydids, And Crickets Of The United States, Capinera, Scott, Walker. 2004. Cornell University Press.
 Otte, Daniel (1994). Crickets (Grylloidea). Orthoptera Species File 1, 120.

latipennis 
Orthoptera of North America
Insects described in 1881